Systems art is art influenced by cybernetics, and systems theory, that reflects on natural systems, social systems and social signs of the art world itself.

Systems art emerged as part of the first wave of the conceptual art movement extended in the 1960s and 1970s. Closely related and overlapping terms are anti-form movement, cybernetic art, generative systems, process art, systems aesthetic, systemic art, systemic painting, and systems sculptures.

Related fields of systems art

Anti-form movement 
By the early 1960s, minimalism had emerged as an abstract movement in art (with roots in geometric abstraction via Malevich, the Bauhaus and Mondrian) which rejected the idea of relational, and subjective painting, the complexity of abstract expressionist surfaces, and the emotional zeitgeist and polemics present in the arena of action painting. Minimalism argued that extreme simplicity could capture all of the sublime representation needed in art. The term Systematic art was coined by Lawrence Alloway in 1966 as a description of the method artists, such as Kenneth Noland, Al Held and Frank Stella, were using for composing abstract paintings.

Associated with painters such as Frank Stella, minimalism in painting, as opposed to other areas, is a modernist movement. Depending on the context, minimalism might be construed as a precursor to the postmodern movement. Seen from the perspective of writers who sometimes classify it as a postmodern movement, early minimalism began and succeeded as a modernist movement to yield advanced works, but which partially abandoned this project when a few artists changed direction in favor of the anti-form movement.

In the late 1960s, the term postminimalism was coined by Robert Pincus-Witten to describe minimalist derived art which had content and contextual overtones which minimalism rejected, and was applied to the work of Eva Hesse, Keith Sonnier, Richard Serra and new work by former minimalists Robert Smithson, Robert Morris, Bruce Nauman, Sol LeWitt, and Barry Le Va, and others. Minimalists like Donald Judd, Dan Flavin, Carl Andre, Agnes Martin, John McCracken and others continued to produce their late modernist paintings and sculpture for the remainder of their careers.

Cybernetic art 

Audio feedback and the use of Tape loops, sound synthesis and computer generated compositions reflected a cybernetic awareness of information, systems, and cycles. Such techniques became widespread in the 1960s in the music industry. The visual effects of electronic feedback became a focus of artistic research in the late 1960s, when video equipment first reached the consumer market. Steina and Woody Vasulka, for example, used "all manner and combination of audio and video signals to generate electronic feedback in their respective of corresponding media."

With related work by Edward Ihnatowicz, Wen-Ying Tsai and cybernetician Gordon Pask and the animist kinetics of Robert Breer and Jean Tinguely, the 1960s produced a strain of cybernetic art that was very much concerned with the shared circuits within and between the living and the technological. A line of cybernetic art theory also emerged during the late 1960s. Writers like Jonathan Benthall and Gene Youngblood drew on cybernetics and cybernetic. The most substantial contributors here were the British artist and theorist Roy Ascott with his essay "Behaviourist Art and the Cybernetic Vision" in the journal Cybernetica (1966–67), and the American critic and theorist Jack Burnham. In Beyond Modern Sculpture from 1968, Burnham builds cybernetic art into an extensive theory that centers on art's drive to imitate and ultimately reproduce life. Also in 1968, curator Jasia Reichardt organized the landmark exhibition, Cybernetic Serendipity, at the Institute of Contemporary Art in London.

Generative systems 

Generative art is art that has been generated, composed, or constructed in an algorithmic manner through the use of systems defined by computer software algorithms, or similar mathematical or mechanical or randomised autonomous processes. Sonia Landy Sheridan established Generative Systems as a program at the School of the Art Institute of Chicago in 1970 in response to social change brought about in part by the computer-robot communications revolution. The program, which brought artists and scientists together, was an effort at turning the artist's passive role into an active one by promoting the investigation of contemporary scientific—technological systems and their relationship to art and life. Unlike copier art, which was a simple commercial spin-off, Generative Systems was actually involved in the development of elegant yet simple systems intended for creative use by the general population. Generative Systems artists attempted to bridge the gap between elite and novice by directing the line of communication between the two, thus bringing first generation information to greater numbers of people and bypassing the entrepreneur.

Process art 

Process art is an artistic movement as well as a creative sentiment and world view where the end product of art and craft, the objet d’art, is not the principal focus. The 'process' in process art refers to the process of the formation of art: the gathering, sorting, collating, associating, and patterning. Process art is concerned with the actual doing; art as a rite, ritual, and performance. Process art often entails an inherent motivation, rationale, and intentionality. Therefore, art is viewed as a creative journey or process, rather than as a deliverable or end product.

In the artistic discourse, the work of Jackson Pollock is hailed as an antecedent. Process art in its employment of serendipity has a marked correspondence with Dada. Change and transience are marked themes in the process art movement. The Guggenheim Museum states that Robert Morris in 1968 had a groundbreaking exhibition and essay defining the movement and the Museum Website states as "Process artists were involved in issues attendant to the body, random occurrences, improvisation, and the liberating qualities of nontraditional materials such as wax, felt, and latex. Using these, they created eccentric forms in erratic or irregular arrangements produced by actions such as cutting, hanging, and dropping, or organic processes such as growth, condensation, freezing, or decomposition".

Systemic art 
According to Chilvers (2004), "earlier in 1966 the British art critic Lawrence Alloway had coined the term "Systemic art", to describe a type of abstract art characterized by the use of very simple standardized forms, usually geometric in character, either in a single concentrated image, or repeated in a system arranged according to a clearly visible principle of organization. He considered the chevron paintings of Kenneth Noland as examples of Systemic art, and considered this as a branch of Minimal art".

John G. Harries considered a common ground in the ideas that underlie developments in 20th-century art such as Serial art, Systems Art, Constructivism and Kinetic art. These kind of arts often do not stem directly from observations of things visible in the external natural environment, but from the observation of depicted shapes and of the relationship between them. Systems art, according to Harries, represents a deliberate attempt by artists to develop a more flexible frame of reference. A style in which its frame of reference is taken as a model to be emulated rather than as a cognitive systems, that only leads to the institutionalization of the imposed model. But to transfer the meaning of a picture to its location within a systemic structure does not remove the need to define the constitutive elements of the system: if they are not defined, one will not know how to build the system.

Systemic painting 
Systemic Painting, according to Auping (1989), "was the title of a highly influential exhibition at the Guggenheim Museum in 1966 assembled and introduction written by Lawrence Alloway as curator. The show contained numerous works that many critics today would consider part of the Minimal art". In the catalogue Alloway noted, that ... "paintings, such as those in this exhibition are not, as has been often claimed, impersonal. The personal is not expunged by using a neat technique: anonymity is not a consequence of highly finishing a painting". The term "systemic painting" later on has become the name for artists who employ systems make a number of aesthetic decisions before commencing
to paint.

Systems sculpture 
According to Feldman (1987), "serial art, serial painting, systems sculpture and ABC art, were art styles of the 1960s and 1970s in which simple geometric configurations are repeated with little or no variation. Sequences becomes important as in mathematics and linguistic context. These works rely on simple arrangements of basic volumes and voids, mechanically produced surfaces, and algebraic permutations of form. The impact on the viewer, however, is anything but simple".

See also 

Algorithmic art
Computer art
Conceptual art
Design
Evolutionary art
Fractal art
Generative art
Information art
Interactive art
Media art
Participatory art
Process music
Software art
Sustainable art
Systems thinking
Systems music

References

Further reading 
 Vladimir Bonacic (1989), "A Transcendental Concept for Cybernetic Art in the 21st Century", in: Leonardo, Vol. 22, No. 1, Art and the New Biology: Biological Forms and Patterns (1989), pp. 109–111.
 Jack Burnham (1968), "Systems Esthetics", in: Artforum (September 1968).
 Karen Cham, Jeffrey Johnson (2007), "Complexity Theory: A Science of Cultural Systems?", in: M/C journal, Volume 10 Issue 3 June 2007
 Francis Halsall (2007), "Systems Aesthetics and the System as Medium", Systems Art Symposium Whitechapel Art Gallery, 2007.
 Pamela Lee, (2004), Chronophobia. Cambridge, Massachusetts: MIT Press.
 Eddie Price (1974), Systems Art: An Enquiry, City of Birmingham Polytechnic, School of Art Education, 
 Edward A. Shanken, "Cybernetics and Art: Cultural Convergence in the 1960s," in Bruce Clarke and Linda Dalrymple Henderson, eds. From Energy to Information: Representation in Science, Technology, Art, and Literature. (Stanford: Stanford University Press, 2002): 255–77.
 Edward A. Shanken, "Art in the Information Age: Technology and Conceptual Art," in SIGGRAPH 2001 Electronic Art and Animation Catalog, (New York: ACM SIGGRAPH, 2001): 8–15; expanded and reprinted in Art Inquiry 3: 12 (2001): 7–33 and Leonardo 35:3 (August 2002): 433–38.
 Edward A. Shanken, "The House That Jack Built: Jack Burnham’s Concept of Software as a Metaphor for Art," Leonardo Electronic Almanac 6:10 (November 1998). Reprinted in English and Spanish in a minima 12 (2005): 140–51.
 Edward A. Shanken, "Reprogramming Systems Aesthetics: A Strategic Historiography," in Simon Penny, et al., eds., Proceedings of the Digital Arts and Culture Conference 2009, DAC: 2009.
 Edward A. Shanken, Systems. Whitechapel/MIT Press, 2015.
 Luke Skrebowski (2008), "All Systems Go: Recovering Hans Haacke's Systems Art", in Grey Room, Winter 2008, No. 30, Pages 54–83.

External links 

 Walker, John. "Systems Art". Glossary of Art, Architecture & Design since 1945, 3rd. ed.
 Systems Art Symposium, in de Whitechapel Art Gallery in London in 2007.
 Observing 'Systems-Art' from a Systems-Theoretical Perspective by Francis Halsall: summary of presentation on Chart 2005, 2005.
 Saturation Point: The online editorial and curatorial project for systems, non-objective and reductive artists working in the UK.

Artistic techniques
Conceptual art
Conceptual systems
Contemporary art movements
Digital art
Postmodern art
Systems theory
Systems science